The 2014–15 season is Fenerbahçe's 57th consecutive season in the Süper Lig and their 107th year in existence.

Season overview

 On 3 July 2014, Miroslav Stoch was loaned out to Al Ain for €1 million on a one-year deal. The same day, Stoch also extended his contract with Fenerbahçe until the end of the 2017–18 season.
 On 7 July 2014, Salih Uçan was sent on a two-year loan to Roma for €4.75 million. Initially a two-year loan, the Giallorossi hold an €11 buy-out option for the player.

 On 12 July 2014, Former Atlético Madrid midfielder Diego has completed his move to Fenerbahçe on a free transfer following the expiry of his VfL Wolfsburg contract. Following a lengthy spell of negotiations, the Brazilian signed a three-year deal at a reported salary of €3.5 million per year.
 On 14 July 2014, Caner Erkin has extended his contract until 2016.
 On 15 July 2014, Fenerbahçe completed their first pre-season training. The players who were involved in the 2014 FIFA World Cup were still on vacation.
 On 19 July 2014, Fenerbahçe unveiled its new Adidas 2014–15 home, away and third kits, which will feature no sponsor logo for the first time in 36 years. Adidas and Fenerbahçe extended their kit deal in February 2014 at least until 2018–19, with the deal worth a reported $8.5 million per season. The 2014–15 home kit features the traditional design of the club.
 On 19 July 2014, Fenerbahçe, will play their first preparation match with long-established English club Sheffield United at United's home ground Bramall Lane Stadium, known as world's oldest stadium. The income from the match will be donated to people affected by the Soma mine disaster.
 On 19 July 2014, Fenerbahçe will be hosting a mini-tournament organised by IMG-Doğuş AS, will run in a mini-league format, with one point awarded for a draw and three for a win. The team with the highest number of points after all matches have been played will be crowned winners of the competition. Fenerbahçe will play two 45-minute matches against Chelsea and their Istanbul neighbours Beşiktaş at the Şükrü Saracoğlu Stadium. All proceeds from the mini-tournament will go towards helping the victims and families of those who suffered when an explosion at a mine in Soma on 13 May killed 301 people, the worst disaster of its kind Turkey has suffered.
 On 31 July 2014, Fenerbahçe lost 2–1 in a charity friendly match with Sheffield United in aid of the Soma mine disaster.
 On 10 April 2015, Dirk Kuyt has agreed to sign with Feyenoord after his contract will expire on 31 May 2015.

Squad

First team squad

As of 30 May 2015

Note:Players loan out during the season demonstrated by different colour

Kit 

Supplier: Adidas
Main sponsor: –
Back sponsor: Ülker
Sleeve sponsor: –
Short sponsor: –
Socks sponsor: –

Kit information 
On 19 July 2014, Fenerbahçe unveiled its new Adidas 2014–15 home, away and third kits, which will feature no sponsor logo for the first time in 36 years. Adidas and Fenerbahçe extended their kit deal in February 2014 at least until 2018–19, while it is reported that the Adidas–Fenerbahçe deal is worth $8.5 million per season. The new Fenerbahçe 2014–15 Home Kit features the traditional design of the Turkish club.

Transfers

Total spending:  €0.0 million

Total income:  €5,750,000

Line-up

Squad statistics

Note:Players loan out during the season demonstrated by different colour

Statistics

Goals

Assists

Overall

Pre-season friendlies

Turkish Super Cup

Süper Lig

League table

Results summary

Results by round

Matches

Türkiye Kupası

Group stage

Round of 16

Quarter-finals

Semi-finals

See also
 2014 Turkish Super Cup
 2014–15 Süper Lig
 2014–15 Turkish Cup

References

Fenerbahçe S.K. (football) seasons
Fenerbahce